The Observer is a British newspaper published on Sundays.

The Observer may also refer to:

Periodicals

Australia
 The Observer (Gladstone), a daily newspaper in Queensland
The Observer, a fortnightly magazine founded in 1958 and absorbed by The Bulletin in 1961
The Observer (Adelaide), a weekly paper established in 1843
 The Northern Daily Leader, a daily newspaper est. 1876 and published in Tamworth, New South Wales, previously known as The Tamworth Observer and Northern Advertiser (1876–1910), The Tamworth Daily Observer (1910–1917) and The Daily Observer (1917–1921)

United Kingdom
Bristol Observer, a weekly local newspaper
Harrow Observer, a weekly local newspaper
Stratford Observer, a weekly local newspaper
Watford Observer, a weekly local newspaper

United States
The Observer (Kearny, New Jersey), a weekly newspaper
 The New York Observer, a Manhattan newspaper
 The Dallas Observer, an alternative weekly
 The Observer, student newspaper at Bristol Community College, Massachusetts
 The Charlotte Observer, in North Carolina
 The News & Observer, in North Carolina 
 The Moultrie Observer, in Georgia
 The Observer, student newspaper of Case Western Reserve University
 The Fordham Observer, one of two official student newspapers at Fordham University
 The Observer (Notre Dame), joint student newspaper of University of Notre Dame, Holy Cross College, and Saint Mary's College, Notre Dame, Indiana
 The Fayetteville Observer, in North Carolina
 The Weekly Observer, in Hemingway, South Carolina
 The Observer (La Grande), daily newspaper in Oregon
 The Portland Observer, a weekly newspaper in Oregon
 Observer (Dunkirk), a newspaper in New York
 The Observer, official student newspaper of Yeshiva University's Stern College for Women
 Ann Arbor Observer, monthly magazine in Michigan
 The Texas Observer, a political magazine

Other
 The Daily Observer (Antigua), the only daily newspaper of Antigua and Barbuda, est. 1993
 The Daily Observer (Bangladesh), est. 2011
 The Bangladesh Observer (1949–2010)
 United Church Observer, Canadian Christian magazine
The Daily Observer, in Gambia
 The Jamaica Observer, a daily newspaper published in Kingston
 The Liberian Observer, est. 1981
 The Pakistan Observer, est. 2008
The Sarnia Observer, a local newspaper in Ontario, Canada, stylised as The Observer (Canada)
Sunday Observer (Sri Lanka)
The St. Kitts-Nevis Observer
 The Observer, an EP by the American band The Strokes.
The Observer (Uganda)
 The Wrestling Observer Newsletter, a trade publication

Fiction
The Observer, 1785 book by Richard Cumberland
The Observer, a character in the TV series Fringe
The Observer, a play by Matt Charman which debuted in 2009
The Birdwatcher aka The Observer, a 1988 Estonian film by Arvo Iho

See also
 Observer (disambiguation)
 Daily Observer (disambiguation)
 National Observer (disambiguation)